Channeling, or channelling, may refer to:

Science
 Channelling (physics), the process that constrains the path of a charged particle in a crystalline solid
 Metabolite or substrate channeling in biochemistry and cell physiology

Other
 Legal channeling, a contractual or legal redirection of responsibilities from an organization to another
 Mediumship, influences attributed to esoteric communications via a person described as a medium or channel
 Chopping and channeling of an automobile's body

See also
 Channel (disambiguation)